The Comboni Missionary Sisters (S.M.C.) are a Catholic religious institute originally founded under the name Piae Madres Nigritiae, translated as the "Pious Mothers of the Nigritia" or "The Devout Mothers of Africa".
They are also known as the Missionary Sisters Pie Madre della Nigrizia
or the Missionary Sisters of Verona,

History 

Daniele Comboni was a missionary in Sudan briefly in 1858–1859. In 1864 he wrote a plan for the regeneration of Africa to focus the global Catholic Church's interest in the evangelization of the continent while emphasizing the African people themselves as agents of this evangelization. He established a male religious order, the Comboni Missionaries of the Heart of Jesus, on 1 June 1867. Comboni attempted to affiliate the male order with a female congregation to cooperate in missionary action (the Virgin of Charity). The attempt to set up the female branch failed and was postponed, so Comboni spoke to the Sisters of St. Joseph of the Apparition. With the support of these sisters and the Sacred Congregation for the Propagation of the Faith, Comboni founded the Institute of the Motherland of Nigrizia in Montorio Veronese in Verona, Italy on 1 January 1872.

On 8 December 1874, the bishop of Verona, Luigi di Canossa, handed over to the first eight aspirants the constitutions.
He reviewed and approved and allowed them to start the novitiate. Comboni returned momentarily to Verona to receive the profession of the vows of the first two Sisters of his Congregation on 15 October 1876.
The first Comboni sisters came to Africa in 1877.

Comboni died on 10 October 1881, around the same time that the Mahdist War in Sudan began. The order struggled with both a leadership vacuum and the loss of eight sisters who were held as prisoners by the Mahdist rebels. Eventually, Maria Bollezzoli, who had joined the order on 6 September 1874, emerged as a strong first General Superior, and led the Pious Mothers through rapid development until her death in 1901.

Throughout Bollezzoli's lifetime, the Comboni sisters were active only in Egypt, Sudan, and at their motherhouse in Verona. Between 1900–1930, they spread into Eritrea, and the African Great Lakes region. Between 1930 and 1960, they spread even more to additional African countries, the United States, Latin America, the Middle East, and created new centers for novitiate formation in Europe.

Formal recognition 

The Congregation received the Papal Decree of Praise
on 22 February 1897
and its constitutions were approved by the Holy See
on 10 June 1912.

Vision 

Comboni founded the order not for nuns, but as strong-willed missionaries.
He told the sisters not to hold their "head bent to one side, because in Africa one needs to hold the neck straight and be ready for lots of sacrifices and, if necessary, even for martyrdom."
Contrary to typical views at the time, he regarded them as of equal dignity with the male missionaries in Africa, and wanted them to have the same training and practices.
In his correspondence, Comboni sometimes described the ministry of missionary sisters as a "priesthood".

Comboni listed the activities of early sisters: "religious instruction, school, orphanages, refuges for slaves, nursing the sick in hospital and at home, baptism in harems and in pagan families."

Activity and dissemination 

While the specific purpose of the Combonis is missionary work among the peoples of Africa, they also work in the field of evangelization on other continents.
The Comboni Missionary Sisters are present in Europe (Germany, Italy, Poland, Portugal, United Kingdom, Spain), Africa (Cameroon, Central African Republic, Chad, Democratic Republic of Congo, Egypt, Eritrea, Ethiopia, Kenya, Mozambique, Zambia), the Americas (Brazil, Colombia, Costa Rica, Ecuador, Guatemala, Mexico, Peru, United States of America) and Asia (United Arab Emirates, Jordan, Israel);
The headquarters is on Tito Livio Avenue in Rome.

On 21 September 2016, Luigia Coccia was elected Superior General of the Institute. On 31 December 2008, the congregation had 1,529 religious in 192 houses.

Notable
Alicia Vacas Moro, who was a nurse and leader in the Comboni Missionary Sisters, was awarded the International Women of Courage Award in 2021 after being nominated by the Holy See.

Notes

Citations

References

Further reading

External links 

 
 
  – a video describing their lifestyle.
 

 
1872 establishments in Italy
Catholic Church in Africa
Ordination of women and the Catholic Church
Religious organizations established in 1872
Catholic female orders and societies
Catholic missionary orders
Catholic religious institutes established in the 19th century